Thomas "Tom" Willett (born 1938) is an American television and film actor, record producer, singer-songwriter, and YouTuber. Called the "modern-day silent screen star", Willett is best known for playing non-speaking roles, such as the character Tom on the sitcom television series Dear John which ran on NBC from 1988 to 1992.

Career
In April 1956 at age 17, Willett moved to Los Angeles. He produced country music records in the evenings, while working at a furniture warehouse during the day. His label was called Freeway Records and boasted releases by musicians such as Greg Penny; as well as Willett's own piano-playing alter-ego, "Herman Schmerdley". One of his songs, a rockabilly tune called "Mona Lisa", received significant airplay and allowed Willett the opportunity to perform on such shows as The Gong Show. For several years, Willett produced numerous records under his pseudonym, mostly covers and original tunes; until the market for country music singles began to dwindle. "The country singles market is somewhat limited," he once said in an interview, "and that's going to hurt us because we're putting out country singles." Following his recording career, Willett toured for a short period of time, performing in piano bars and honky-tonks throughout the south. By 1962, Willett moved to Las Vegas where he took up writing material for second rate comedy acts. In addition to writing comedic routines, he also wrote country tunes for various rising stars, including Roy Clark.

After a short stint as a disc jockey at KENO radio, Willett began landing bit parts in films and television shows. "I’ve been in some dreadful movies," Willett once said. One of his first gigs was as an extra in the 1975 American comedy-drama film Rafferty and the Gold Dust Twins. More notable roles include playing opposite Mary Steenburgen in the film Melvin and Howard, along with television spots in shows such as Happy Days, The Drew Carey Show and Dear John.

On the series Dear John, Willett played a character that never spoke. For the auditions, Willett recalls that he beat out the other applicants by wearing a suit with wide lapels and a "behind-the-times" tie. "They told me the guy should be well-dressed," Willett said, "and he should be immaculate, but there’s got to be something wrong about him. So I made him 15 years behind the times." When it came to auditions, Willett said, "You’re not supposed to crash auditions, but I crashed auditions." Standing 6-foot 5 inches tall, Willett invested small amounts of money in audition attire. "One of the things I did, I got an Abe Lincoln beard and hat and everything. I was Abe Lincoln in a lot of productions ... I could be a cowboy, I could be a prisoner, I could be a detective."

According to Willett, he has had "over 800 jobs in front of the camera", including over 100 films, 80 television movies and more than 145 TV programs; mostly uncredited and non-speaking roles.

YouTube channel
Willett made his first YouTube video in 2006; but it was not until August 2012 that he gained internet fame with a 10-minute video tutorial entitled "How to Eat a Watermelon". The Huffington Post called him "the Bob Ross of watermelon eating". The video garnered over 3 million views, Willett's channel had over 319K subscribers and as of October 2021 over 39 million views total.

Called a "YouTube sensation" in Nashville Scene, Willett's channel is titled Featureman. Online food reviewer Clayton Trutor commented that Willett has a "refreshing appreciation for the ordinary" and "the ability to make the seemingly mundane seem awfully interesting". Willett continues to make videos regularly on various topics that range anywhere from stock tips and original songs to cooking tutorials and fast food reviews.

Filmography
(partial listing of notable television and film appearances)

Bibliography

References

External links

"The Featureman" YouTube Channel

1938 births
Living people
20th-century American male actors
American male film actors
American male television actors
American YouTubers
English-language YouTube channels
American singer-songwriters
Place of birth missing (living people)